René Ramos Latour (May 12, 1932 in Antilla, Cuba – 30 July 1958) was a commander under Fidel Castro during the Cuban Revolution. He was killed in combat against the Cuban army during the Battle of Las Mercedes.

References

External links 

 René Ramos Latour

1932 births
1958 deaths
People from Holguín Province
Cuban people of Spanish descent
Cuban revolutionaries
Cuban guerrillas
Guerrillas killed in action